Robert Boyd, 5th Lord Boyd (c. 1517 – 3 January 1590) was a Scottish noble and courtier.

Biography
Robert was the only son and heir of Robert, 4th Lord Boyd. He was born about 1517, and first appears in the historical record on 5 May 1534, when he was appointed Bailie and Chamberlain of Kilmarnock in place of his father. On 6 September 1545, he, as son and heir-apparent of Robert Boyd of Kilmarnock, had a charter of the Lordship of Kilmarnock on his father's resignation, with sasine following 22 September. On 10 February 1549, he granted a charterer to Marion Colquhoun, his father's wife, and he himself had a charter of the lands of Auchiutorlie and others on 14 October 1550.<ref> cites 'Reg. Mag. Sig., 11 February 1540-49 and 14 October 1550.</ref>  In his time was ended the Boyd-Montgomerie feud, which had lasted since 1484. 

In 1560, Hew Montgomerie of Hessilheid, was one of the witnesses to the contract between Robert Lord Boyde and Neil Montgomery of Langschaw, at Glasgow.

On 25 August 1563, Hugh Montgomerie, 4th Earl of Eglinton, and Robert, Lord Boyd, entered into a mutual bond of defence, and the same day the former assigned to the latter his right to the office of Bailie of the canon lands of Cunyngham pertaining to the Canons and Chapter of Glasgow. In 1563 the same Hew Montgomerie signing himself Hugo of Hessilheid witnessed an Instrument of Assignation [land deed] by Hugh 3rd Earl of Eglington to Robert Lord Boyde of the bailliary lands of the canon lands in Cunningham.

In 1576, Hew Montgomerie of Hassilheid [Hazelhead] was witness to the marriage of Hugh Montgomery [afterwards the 4th Earl] of Eglington to Gelis Boyde daughter of Robert Lord Boyde. Hugh and Gelis had only one son Hugh Montgomerie 5th Earl of Eglington. The 5th Earl Hugh Montgomery, son of Hugh & Gelis, had no children and left everything to his cousin.
In 1582, Hew Montgomerie was witness to the contract of marriage between Robert master of Seaton and Margaret Montgomerie the daughter of Hugh 3rd Earl of Eglington, with issue 6th Earl Alexander Seaton  [This cousin was, was man of the hour, son of Margaret Montgomery and Robert master of Seaton.]
Another younger son of Robert 5th lord Boyd was Col. David Boyd who went to Northern Ireland. In 1609 Col. David Boyde was a cadet of the house of the Kilmarnock family. On 2 August 1609, Con O'Neil granted to Col. David Boyde the townland of Ballymachaecet [Ballymacarret East Belfast] one parcel of land, without woods, called Stranmore [Stormount] in the parish of Knockcolmkill [Knock Belfast] between the river of Belfast [Lagan] and the river of Strathaream and the townland of Ballymurtery. He had a son called Robert Boyd.  

Montgomery Manuscripts
Boyd first appears in Parliament when it met at Edinburgh 29 November 1558, and he was then elected on the Articles.

Boyd supported Lords of the Congregation, in their war with Mary of Guise the Queen-Regent, and was with them at Perth May 1559. In February 1560 he was one of the signatories to the Treaty of Berwick, by which Queen Elizabeth I of England agreed to send a force to assist them in driving out the French, and the following April he joined the English army at the Prestonpans. On the 27 of that month he was one of the Scottish nobles who signed the bond pledging themselves "to set forward the reformation of religion and to expel the French."

Robert Boyd was present at the unsuccessful attack made on Leith on 7 May by the English, and on 10 May signed the document by which the Treaty of Berwick was confirmed. On 16 August 1560 he signed the address to Elizabeth, praying her to marry the James Hamilton, Earl of Arran, and on 27 January 1561 he subscribed the "Book of Discipline of the Kirk". He was also a party to the bond signed at Ayr on 3 September the following year to "maintain and assist the preaching of the Evangel". He took part in the attempt on Edinburgh after the marriage of Queen Mary to Lord Darnley, for which he was cited to appear before the King and Queen on 6 September, and before the Privy Council 29 October. He was declared guilty of lèse majesté'' on  1 December 1565. Shortly afterwards, on 6 March 1566, he had a pardon from "Henry, King of Scots", and was commanded to repair to Court. Boyd's political attitude now underwent a complete change. He was one of the jury who acquitted Bothwell, 12 April 1567, and 17 May following, two days after the Queen's forced marriage with that nobleman, was made a Privy Councillor. From this time forward he was unceasing in his efforts to obtain the release and restoration of his Queen. Nevertheless he joined Moray's Council, but immediately left it on Mary's escape from Loch-leven, 2 May 1568; he joined her at Hamilton with two of his sons and a considerable force, and fought for her at the battle of Langside, 13 May. After that defeat he retired to Kilmarnock, and on 24 May was ordered by the Council to deliver "the castell, tour, and fortalice of Kilmarnock, and also the tour and fortalice of Law", which he did. He joined in the letter to the Duke of Alva (general and governor of the Spanish Netherlands), asking for his assistance on Mary's behalf, 30 July.
 
In September 1568, Boyd was appointed one of Bishop John Lesley' colleagues for the conference to be held at York, and while there is accused of having "practised to steale away" Mary secretly. He afterwards accompanied the Bishop to London, and was one of the Commissioners for Queen Mary. Lord Boyd was entrusted by Thomas, Duke of Norfolk with a diamond to deliver to Queen Mary at Coventry as a pledge of his affection and fidelity, and in a letter to him, apparently written in December 1569, she says: "I took the diamant from my lord Boyd, which I shall kepe unseene about my neck till I give it agayn to the owner of it and me both". On 4 June 1569 he was appointed by her to treat with her subjects of Scotland anent a reconciliation,
 and to proceed in an action for a divorce from Bothwell. The Privy Council decided to do nothing, and after reporting the failure of his mission to Mary, Lord Boyd appears to have remained in England for some time, during which the record of his life is very scanty.

At this time he stood very high in the estimation of Mary, who desired to retain him, with the Bishop of Ross, permanently about her person. Permsion for this was granted by Elizabeth, 30 March.

Before this permission was received, however, Boyd had returned to Scotland, and was actively engaged in preparing for a general rising in Mary's favour. He was suspected of complicity in the murder of the James, 1st Earl of Moray on 22 January 1570, and was with the Hamiltons at Glasgow 17 February. On the Friday after, 22 February, he and the Archibald, 5th Earl of Argyll met the William, 6th Earl of Morton and the Laird of Lethington at "Dawkethe", and on 16 April he signed the letter from the Duke of Châtellerault to Queen Elizabeth, praying her to come to an agreement with Mary. In June 1570 he is mentioned as being at Kilmarnock and remaining "constantly at the Queen's obedience". In a postscript to Randolph's letter to Sussex, 21 August, he says: "The 'brute' is that Lord Boyd is taken". In September Queen Mary mentions him as one of the nobles from whom two could be chosen to treat on her behalf with Elizabeth, and the Bishop of Ross writes to him, 1 October: "The English will be content to restore the Queen of Scotland to her realm, I take it. But tliat they have the Prince, her son, in their hands". Early in 1571 he appears to have been again in England; on 10 March the Bishop of Ross writes to Burghley: "Morton promised to Boyd before his departure out of Scotland to abstain from all that might hinder the Queen's restitution, and to agree", but he was back at Edinburgh in April, and on 30 May Morton declared to him that the treaty was dissolved.

Boyd attended the meeting of the nobility at Dunblane on 17 July 1571, and is recorded as having endeavoured to bring all to the Queen's side;  but on 12 August he, together with the Earls of Argyll, Oassillis, and Eglinton, Econsidering the calamite quhairwith this realme, thair native cuntre, is plagit", and that the Queen was detained in England, came to an agreement with the Earls of Morton and Mar to serve the King.

The Queen had evidently anticipated something of the kind, as on 28 June she had written to de la Motte Fénelon that she was advised that Argyll, Atholl, and Boyd "comme désespérés d'aucuue ayde commancent à se rettirer et regarder qui aura du meilleur".

On 5 September Lord Boyd was a consenting party to the election of the Earl of Mar as Regent, and two days afterwards he was made a Privy Councillor. The same day he signed the admonition to those who held Edinburgh against the King. On 8 September he had a remission under the Great Seal. He was included in the Act of Indemnity of 26 January 1572, and subscribed the Articles of Pacification at Perth on 23 February 1573, by one of which he was appointed one of the judges of the trial of claims for restitution of goods arising out of acts of violence committed during the Civil War; Provost of Glasgow 1574 to 1577, and an Extraordinary Lord of Session 24 October 1573.

On 2 January 1574 Boyd obtained from Morton charters of the offices of Bailiary and Justiciary of the regality of Glasgow for himself and his heirs, having in the previous November forcibly ejected Sir John Stewart. The same year he was appointed a Commissioner for musters in the Bailiary of Cunningham. Boyd lost his seat both at the Council table and on the Bench, but on Morton's appointment as Prime Minister in July he was again appointed a Privy Councillor, and on 25 October had his seat on the Bench restored to him. On the 23rd of the same month he was compelled to surrender the Bailiary of the Regality of Glasgow to the King, as Earl of Lennox On 8 September he was one of the eight noblemen nominated by the King for quieting the troubles "that be thair gude counsale and assistence sa gude and  a work may proceid and be set fordwart, to the plesour of God, his Hienes obedience and the repose and quietnes of the troublit commounwelth".

The next year, he was, on 1 May 1575, appointed one of the commission to pursue and arrest the Lords John and Claude Hamilton, who were charged with the murders of the Regents Moray and Lennox. They, however, made good their escape into England. The commissioners were thanked by Parliament for their services 22 May. Lord Boyd was a party to the conspiracy known as the Raid of Ruthven, but on its collapse he retired to France, from whence he was recalled by a highly complimentary letter from King James, dated 11 February 1586. He was back in Scotland before 21 June, when for the third time he was appointed an Extraordinary Lord of Session, and he was one of the three Scottish commissioners who negotiated the treaty of alliance with England, which was signed 5 July.

On 4 April 1588 he was a commissioner to raise the £100,000 for the expenses connected with the King's marriage. On 4 July that year he resigned his seat on the bench.' In 1589 he was placed on the commission to enforce the statute against the Jesuits,  and in October, on the King's leaving for Norway, was constituted one of the Wardens of the Marches, with a seat on the Council. This was his last public appearance, and he died 3 January 1590, aged seventy-two, having for over thirty years played a prominent part in Scottish history. He was buried in the Low Church at Kilmarnock. His will was proved at Edinburgh, 8 June 1590.

G.R Hewitt writing of Robert Boyd in the Oxford Dictionary of National Biography wrote:

Family

Boyd had been careful to pursue the policy commenced by his father in cultivating the support and friendship of his neighbours. Among the Boyd Papers are numerous bonds of manrent. He had, however, broken the old family alliance with the Mures, and a feud continued for several years, till, on 14 September 1589, Lord Boyd paid John Mure of Rowallan 350 marks for the slaughter of his father.

On 24 August 1536 Humphrey Colquhoun of Luss, as lord superior, granted to Robert Boyd and Margaret Colquhoun, daughter and heiress of John [sic] Colquhoun of Glinns, his spouse, a charter of the lands of Glens, in Stirling, and they had, 18 February 1547, a charter under the Great Seal of Balindoran in the same county. He acquired the barony of Portincross and Ardneill from Robert Boyd of that place by contract, 19 April 1572, and had sasine 24 May 1574, following a Crown charter of 11 March of the said lands "formerly belonging to Archibald Boyd". He also had charters of Giflardland, on resignation by Isabella and Margaret Oraufurd, 14 September 1577, and of Bedlay, Molany, etc. 10 February 1582-83.

Lord Boyd married (contract dated 1535 ) his cousin-german, Margaret, daughter and heiress of George (not Sir John) Colquhoun, 4th of Glens, by his wife Margaret Boyd, by which marriage the estates of Glens, Bedlay, Benheath, Stablegreen of Glasgow, and other lands passed to the Boyds. She survived him, and died a widow August 1601, being buried in the Metropolitan Church of Glasgow, where there is a tomb to her beside St. Mungo's well in the south-east of the lower church. By her will, dated 13 May 1601, she appointed Alexander Colquhoun of Colquhoun and Luss her executor. They had issue : — 
 Thomas, Lord Boyd.
 Robert of Badenheath or Badinhaith in Stirlingshire. He fought for his Queen at Langside 13 May 1568, for which he had pardon 8 September 1571. On 4 March 1572 he was appointed Keeper of the fortalice of Lochwood, with the pertinents and lands in barony of Glasgow, and had a pass 23 April 1585 from James VI to go to France for three years, "having certain lefull effaires to do within the realm of France, and specialize for visiting of our traist cousing Robert, Lord Boyd". He was appointed tutor to his nephew Hugh Montgomerie, 5th Earl of Eglinton, after the murder of his brother-in-law 18 April 1586. He was one of the lesser Barons summoned to the Convention of Estates at Edinburgh 7 June 1605. He died July 1611. His testament, which was made at his "dwelling-house of Badenheath" 14 July 1611, was confirmed at Glasgow 4 May following. He directed that his "body to be buried in his predecessor's aisle, at the Kirk of Leinze". He married Margaret, Lady Badenheath, daughter of William, and sister and heiress of Robert Boyd, both of Badenheath. She was alive April 1567 and dead by February 1572-73.
 Margaret, married (contract 7 December 1554) to John Cuningham of Cuninghamhead. Her father and grandfather were both parties to the contract.
 Helen. By a charter of Hugh Montgomerie of Hesilliead 10 January 1560, following on a contract between the said Hugh and Robert, Lord Boyd and Helen Boyd, his daughter, dated at Glasgow 27 December 1559, she had the ten-merk land of Lyandcorse, in the parish of Neilstoun, Renfrewshire, and the twenty-pound lands of Williyard, in the parish of Beith, "in her pure, spotless, and inviolate virginity", to hold all the days of her life.
 Eqidia or Giles. She was married, as first wife, to Hugh (Montgomerie), Master of Eglintoun, afterwards (3 June 1585) fourth Earl of Eglintoun. The contract wherein she is called Gelis, is dated at Edinburgh, Irvine, and Baidlay 13, 16, and 20 May 1576. They were both under age, the said Hugh being only fourteen, and provision was made for the management of their household and income until he attained the age of seventeen in 1580. She had issue, and died after 1583, and before March 1586.
 Agnes, married, as second wife, to Sir John Colquhoun of Luss, who can have been a widower only a month or two at most. Being related within the forbidden degrees, a dispensation was granted by John Hamilton, Archbishop of St. Andrews, the Papal Legate, 3 November 1564. He died January 1575. She died at Edinburgh 18 July 1584. Her testament-dative and inventar of goods was given up by her son. Sir Humphrey Colquhoun, and confirmed 18 April 1588.
 Christian, married (contract 9 January 1571) to Sir James Hamilton of Evandale and Libbertoun, son and heir of James Hamilton of Orawfurdjohn, and had issue.
 Elisabeth, married, before 6 February 1576, to Sir John Cunningham of Drumquhassill, a widower, with issue, who was dead before 5 June 1590.
Boyd had besides a natural son: Colonel Daind Boyd of Tourgill. Daind had letters of legitimation under the Great Seal 11 July 1582 and a grant of the lands of Tourgill 8 August 1598. David Boyd of Tourgill, Provost, appears as a witness at Edinburgh 6 November 1613. Daind married Margaret Wallace, Lady Hayning, a widow.

Notes

References

External links

Attribution

1510s births
1590 deaths
Year of birth uncertain
16th-century Scottish peers
Robert
Lords of Parliament (pre-1707)
Lords Boyd